726 Naval Air Squadron (726 NAS) was a Naval Air Squadron of the Royal Navy's Fleet Air Arm. It was formed as a Fleet Requirements Unit from 1943 to 1945, operating out of R.N. Air Section Durban (HMS Kongoni), at S.A.A.F. Station Stamford Hill, Durban, South Africa, during its existence. It operated various aircraft including, Beaufighter, Defiant, Fulmar, Harvard, Kingfisher, Martinet and Swordfish.

History of 726 NAS

Fleet Requirements Unit (1943 - 1945) 

726 Naval Air Squadron formed at R.N. Air Section Durban (HMS Kongoni), located at S.A.A.F. Station, Stamford Hill, Durban, South Africa, on 7 July 1943, as a Fleet Requirements Unit. The squadron was initially equipped with two Kingfisher landplane aircraft. From August 1943 the squadron received Swordfish biplane torpedo bomber and Fulmar carrier-borne reconnaissance aircraft/fighter aircraft, however, the Fulmar were gone by October. In December 1943, the squadron received Defiant interceptor aircraft, repurposed as a target tug aircraft, however, six months later these were withdrawn, replaced by Martinet target tug aircraft, designed specifically for target towing, in the June of 1944. Additionally, Beaufighter multi-role aircraft arrived in that month as well, but were gone during the following September. Harvard American single-engined advanced trainer aircraft, arrived around May 1945, however, 726 NAS disbanded on the 3 November 1945.

Aircraft flown 

The squadron has flown a number of different aircraft types, including:
Vought Kingfisher I (Jul 1943 - Sep 1944)
Fairey Swordfish I (Aug 1943 - Nov 1945)
Fairey Swordfish II (Aug 1943 - Nov 1945)
Fairey Fulmar Mk.II (Aug 1943 - Oct 1943)
Supermarine Walrus (Oct 1943 - Nov 1945)
Boulton Paul Defiant TT Mk I (Dec 1943 - May 1944)
Miles Martinet TT.Mk I (Jun 1944 - Nov 1945)
Bristol Beaufighter Mark IIF (Jun 1944 - Sep 1944)
North American Harvard III (May 1945 - Nov 1945)

Naval Air Stations  

726 Naval Air Squadron operated from lodger faculties for one disembarked R.N. Squadron, at S.A.A.F. Station, Stamford Hill, Durban, South Africa:
R. N. Air Section DURBAN (7 July 1943 - 3 November 1945)

Commanding Officers 

List of commanding officers of 726 Naval Air Squadron with month and year of appointment and end:
Lt-Cdr (A) F. G. Hood, SANF (V) (Jul 1943-Jan 1945)
Lt (A) W. A. McElroy, RNVR (KIA) (Jan 1945-Feb 1945)
 ? (Feb 1945-Jun 1945
Lt (A) D. C. Langley, SANF (F) (Jun 1945-Nov 1945)

Notes

Bibliography 

700 series Fleet Air Arm squadrons
Military units and formations established in 1943
Air squadrons of the Royal Navy in World War II